Kate Colby (born 1974, Boston) is an American poet and essayist. She grew up in Massachusetts and received her undergraduate degree from Wesleyan University and an MFA from California College of the Arts. In 1997, she moved to San Francisco, where she worked for several years as a curator at Yerba Buena Center for the Arts, on the board of The LAB art space, and later as a grant writer and copyeditor. In 2008, she moved to Providence, Rhode Island, where she currently works as an editor and serves on the board of the Gloucester Writers Center in Massachusetts.

Her poems and essays have appeared in A Public Space, Aufgabe, The Awl, Bennington Review, Boston Review, Chicago Review, Denver Quarterly, New American Writing, The Nation, The Rumpus, Verse and The Volta, among other journals and periodicals, and has been featured at the RISD, deCordova and Isabella Stewart Gardner museums.

Awards
 2007 Norma Farber First Book Award, Fruitlands. Selected by Rosmarie Waldrop.
 2011 Finalist for Foreword Reviews Poetry Book of the Year Award for Beauport
 2013 Fellowship in Poetry, Rhode Island State Council for the Arts
 2017-2018 Woodberry Poetry Room Creative Fellowship, Harvard University

Works
Poetry collections
 
 
 
 
 Blue Hole. Furniture Press. 2015. .
 
The Arrangements. Four Way. 2018. .Essays'''

 Dream of the Trenches. Noemi Press. 2019. .

 Chapbooks 
 Rock of Ages. Anadama Press. 2005.
 A Banner Year. Belladonna. 2006.
 Engine Light. PressBoardPress. 2015.
 Sun Damage''. Essay Press. 2017

References

External links
 "An Interview with Kate Colby", Bookslut
 Kate Colby PennSound
 Kate Colby Poetry Foundation

Living people
American women poets
California College of the Arts alumni
Wesleyan University alumni
Poets from Massachusetts
1974 births
21st-century American poets
21st-century American women writers